The second Morrison ministry (Liberal–National Coalition) was the 72nd ministry of the Australian Government. It was led by Prime Minister Scott Morrison. The second Morrison ministry succeeded the first Morrison ministry following the 2019 Australian federal election. The ministry was announced on 26 May 2019 and was sworn in on 29 May. Following the Coalition's defeat at the 2022 election, the ministry was succeeded by the Albanese ministry on 23 May 2022.

Final arrangement
On 19 September 2021, industrial, science and technology minister Christian Porter resigned from the cabinet after he was criticised for accepting an anonymous donation from a blind trust to fund his defamation claim against ABC and reporter Louise Milligan for publishing his rape allegation. Energy and emissions reduction minister Angus Taylor took over Porter's portfolios on an acting basis.

In a ministerial reshuffle on 8 October 2021, Taylor gained the industry portfolio, while defence industry minister Melissa Price gained the science and technology portfolio, with both retaining their own portfolios. Alex Hawke was promoted to the cabinet while retaining his immigration portfolio. Ben Morton was promoted to the ministry and was appointed the Special Minister of State and the Public Service Minister, while continuing to assist the Prime Minister and Cabinet. Tim Wilson was appointed the Assistant Minister Assisting the Minister for Industry, Energy and Emissions Reduction.

On 25 October 2021, resources and water minister Keith Pitt was reinstated to the cabinet, after previously being demoted to the outer ministry in July 2021.

On 2 December 2021, education minister Alan Tudge stood down from the cabinet while allegations of his bullying and affair with his former press secretary were being investigated. On 4 March 2022, while the review cleared Tudge of breaking any rules, Tudge decided not to return to the cabinet and said he would resign formally as minister. However, it was confirmed in April 2022 that Tudge had retained his ministerial title, but was officially "on leave". Stuart Robert was the acting education minister while Tudge stood down.

Cabinet

Outer Ministry

Assistant Ministry

Party breakdown

Cabinet
Party breakdown of cabinet ministers (since 25 October 2021):

Entire ministry
Party breakdown of entire ministry:

Fifth arrangement

On 21 June 2021, Deputy Prime Minister and Nationals leader Michael McCormack was replaced by former leader Barnaby Joyce in a leadership spill, resulting in a ministerial reshuffle of National Party members. Joyce was sworn in as Deputy Prime Minister and Minister for Infrastructure, Transport and Regional Development on 22 June 2021, taking over from McCormack. Details of the reshuffle of the other National party members were announced on 27 June 2021. The new ministerial arrangement took effect on 2 July 2021.

McCormack was not given a ministerial portfolio and moved to the backbench. His supporters Mark Coulton and Darren Chester were also stripped of their ministerial portfolios and moved to the backbench. Joyce's supporters Bridget McKenzie and Andrew Gee were promoted to the cabinet, with McKenzie returning to the cabinet since her resignation in February 2020. McKenzie took over the emergency management portfolio (including drought) from deputy party leader David Littleproud, while also gaining the regionalisation (formerly decentralisation), regional communications and regional education from Coulton and Gee. Gee gained the veterans' affairs and defence personnel from Chester. Littleproud retained agriculture and gained the Northern Australia portfolio from Keith Pitt, who retained resources and water but was demoted to the outer ministry. David Gillespie, also a supporter of Joyce, was promoted to the outer ministry and gained the regional health portfolio from Coulton. Gillespie was previously an assistant minister in the Second Turnbull ministry.

As for the assistant ministry, Kevin Hogan became the Assistant Minister for Local Government in addition to his existing portfolios, while Michelle Landry remained Assistant Minister for Children Families, but lost her role as Assistant Minister for Northern Australia.

Cabinet

Outer Ministry

Assistant Ministry

Party breakdown

Cabinet
Party breakdown of cabinet ministers:

Entire ministry
Party breakdown of entire ministry:

Fourth arrangement

Since February and early March 2021, Defence Minister Linda Reynolds and Attorney-General Christian Porter had been criticised for their words and actions during a series of scandals that plagued the Morrison government. Reynolds had been criticised for the mishandling of a rape allegation and complaint by her staffer Brittany Higgins in 2019, while Porter had been accused of raping a 16-year-old when he was 17 in 1988. Reynolds and Porter subsequently took medical leave from 24 February and 4 March respectively, after which, foreign affairs minister Marise Payne was acting defence minister on behalf of Reynolds and employment minister Michaelia Cash was the acting Attorney-General and acting industrial relations minister on behalf of Porter. Peter Dutton was acting Leader of the House on behalf of Porter.

In a ministerial reshuffle on 30 March 2021, Reynolds was demoted to government services and the NDIS, and Porter was demoted to industry and science. Dutton replaced Reynolds as Minister for Defence and officially replaced Porter as Leader of the House. Cash officially replaced Porter as Attorney-General and Minister for Industrial Relations. Karen Andrews took over Dutton's role as Minister for Home Affairs, and Stuart Robert took on Cash's role as employment minister.

There were also changes to other ministers who were not plagued by the scandals. Anne Ruston was appointed Minister for Women's Safety, in addition to her social services portfolio. Jane Hume was appointed Minister for Women's Economic Security, in addition to her superannuation portfolio. Amanda Stoker was appointed Assistant Minister for Women and Assistant Minister for Industrial Relations, in addition to her position as Assistant Attorney-General. Minister for Defence Industry Melissa Price retained her portfolio but returned to the Cabinet. Her promotion to Cabinet would allow the Cabinet to return to its previous record of seven women.

The reshuffle was aimed to "getting the right perspective" in the wake of the justice for women movement. There were no additions or removals of parliamentarians to the ministry.

Cabinet

Outer Ministry

Assistant Ministry

Party breakdown

Cabinet
Party breakdown of cabinet ministers:

Entire ministry
Party breakdown of entire ministry:

Third arrangement
Between March 2020 and May 2021, Scott Morrison was secretly appointed to five additional ministries: Department of Health (14 March 2020), Department of Finance (30 March 2020), Department of Industry, Science, Energy and Resources (15 April 2021), and the departments of Home affairs and Treasury (6 May 2021). Morrison said later that he hadn't used his additional powers, except in one instance in relation to a decision on the Pep-11 offshore gas exploration project.

A ministerial reshuffle was undertaken on 22 December 2020. Health Minister Greg Hunt was given the aged care portfolio in addition his existing health portfolio. The previous aged care minister, Richard Colbeck, remained as Minister for Senior Australians and Aged Care Services. Colbeck also retained the sports portfolio, but lost the youth portfolio to Alan Tudge. Tudge was appointed as Minister for Education and Youth, and his previous urban infrastructure portfolio was given to Communications and Arts Minister Paul Fletcher. The previous Education Minister Dan Tehan was appointed as Trade Minister, taking over from Simon Birmingham who became the Finance Minister two months prior. No additional parliamentarians were appointed to the Cabinet.

Zed Seselja and Jane Hume were promoted to the Outer Ministry, and Amanda Stoker and Andrew Hastie were new additions to the Assistant Ministry. Steve Irons stepped down from the Assistant Ministry to make way for Hastie. Immigration Minister David Coleman, who was on personal leave since December 2019, returned from leave but was demoted to an Assistant Minister.

Cabinet

Outer Ministry

Assistant Ministry

Party breakdown

Cabinet
Party breakdown of cabinet ministers:

Entire ministry
Party breakdown of entire ministry:

Second arrangement
Bridget McKenzie resigned as deputy Nationals leader and from the Cabinet on 2 February 2020 because of a sports grants scandal, while Matt Canavan resigned on 3 February 2020 because he backed former Nationals leader Barnaby Joyce in the 2020 Nationals leadership spill. Following the spill, David Littleproud was elected as deputy leader of the Nationals on 4 February 2020. The portfolios held by Nationals ministers and assistant ministers were reshuffled, effective 6 February 2020.

Littleproud took over the agriculture portfolio from McKenzie, retaining his drought and emergency management portfolios, and losing the water resources portfolio to Keith Pitt. Pitt, who was previously an assistant minister between 2016 and 2018, also took over resources and Northern Australia portfolio from Canavan. Darren Chester continued to hold the veteran affair's and defence personnel portfolios, which were moved from the outer ministry to the cabinet.

Mark Coulton's regional services portfolio was split up into regional health, regional communications and regional education, with Coulton retaining the first two as well as the local government portfolio. Andrew Gee was promoted to the outer ministry and took over the regional education and decentralisation portfolios and the post of Assistant Trade and Investment Minister  from Coulton. Kevin Hogan was promoted to the assistant ministry and replaced Gee as Assistant Minister to the Deputy Prime Minister. Michelle Landry retained her portfolio and was additionally appointed Assistant Minister for Northern Australia.

The new ministers were sworn in on 6 February 2020. The portfolios of Liberal ministers were unchanged, and Alan Tudge continued to be acting Minister for Immigration, Citizenship, Migrant Services and Multicultural Affairs on behalf of David Coleman.

In October 2020, Mathias Cormann retired from federal politics. Simon Birmingham took over Cormann's roles as Leader of the Government in the Senate and Minister for Finance in addition to his own trade portfolio on 31 October 2020. Michaelia Cash became the Deputy Leader of the Government in the Senate. Despite the loss of one cabinet minister, Morrison opted not to make other ministerial changes at the time. The arrangement lasted until the reshuffle in December 2020.

Cabinet

Outer Ministry

Assistant Ministry

Party breakdown

Cabinet
Party breakdown of cabinet ministers:

Entire ministry
Party breakdown of entire ministry:

First arrangement
The first arrangement of the Second Morrison Ministry was sworn in on 29 May 2019. In December 2019, it was announced that Immigration Minister David Coleman would be taking indefinite leave for personal reasons, with Alan Tudge taking over his portfolio as acting minister. The arrangement became unaltered until the resignation of National Party senators Bridget McKenzie and Matt Canavan on 2 and 3 February 2020 respectively. Until the reshuffle on 6 February, Nationals leader and Deputy Prime Minister Michael McCormack was the acting Minister for Agriculture, taking over from McKenzie, while Water Resources minister David Littleproud was the acting Minister for Resources and Northern Australia, taking over from Canavan.

Cabinet

Outer Ministry

Assistant Ministry

See also
 2020s in Australia political history
 Scott Morrison ministerial positions controversy

References

Ministries of Elizabeth II
2019 establishments in Australia
2019 in Australian politics
2022 disestablishments in Australia
2022 in Australian politics
Morrison 2
Cabinets established in 2019
Cabinets disestablished in 2022
Government of Australia
History of Australia (1945–present)
Liberal Party of Australia
Morrison Government
National Party of Australia
Scott Morrison